The following is an incomplete list of people who have attained admiral rank within the South African Navy (SAN).

Key

The ranks of Flag Officers changed on 1 Apr 1998 when the rank previously called Commodore became known as Rear Admiral (Junior Grade). For the purposes of this list if they held the rank of Commodore before 1998 they are listed with that rank

List

See also
 List of South African military chiefs

References

South Africa
South African admirals
Admirals